Anders Flanking  (born 4 October 1957 in Skövde) is a Swedish politician who has been Governor of Gotland County since 1 June 2019.

Flanking studied at the University of Gothenburg and worked at KPMG and Arena for Growth. Flanking is a member of the Centre Party, and was  elected to the city council of his hometown of Skövde in 1989, rising to Chairman of the Skövde Municipal Board during his 9 years on the council. He lost his seat in the February 1998 election, after which he moved to a job in Gothenburg, the second largest city in Sweden.

In 2005, Flanking became chairman of the Centre Party's nominating committee. In 2006 he was elected to the city council of Gothenburg. That same year, he became party secretary for the Centre Party, and also started a five-year term as a member of the Riksbank Council (Sweden's central bank).

In the 2010 Swedish general election, Flanking was elected to the Riksdag as the Member of Parliament (MP) for Gothenburg, leaving the city council and handing the party secretary duties to Michael Arthursson.

On 30 September 2011, Flanking was appointed State Secretary (operational head of the ministry's entire civil service) for the Ministry of the Environment. While serving as State Secretary, Flanking became MP-on-leave, during which time Rickard Nordin and Karin Östring Bergman took turns as acting MP for Gothenburg. When the four-party Alliance lost the 2014 election, Flanking returned to the private sector. In 2016 he was appointed as a director for Kronoberg County, acting as interim Governor for part of his time there. Flanking left Kronoberg when his appointment as Governor of Gotland was announced in May 2019.

References

Members of the Riksdag from the Centre Party (Sweden)
1957 births
Living people

Governors of Gotland